Put a Crown on It is the fifth studio album by American rapper Rittz. It was released on November 29, 2019 through CNT Records with distribution via ONErpm, making it the rapper's first release on his own independent label since leaving Strange Music. Recording sessions took place at Foz Rock in Duluth, Georgia. It features guest appearances from Big Hud, Dizzy Wright, Futuristic, JellyRoll, Paul Wall, Too $hort, Twista and Yelawolf.

Track listing 
Adapted from Apple Music.

Personnel

Jonathan McCollum – main artist
Paul Slayton – featured artist (track 2)
Jason DeFord – featured artist (track 3)
Michael Wayne Atha – featured artist (track 6)
Carl Terrell Mitchell – featured artist (track 6)
La'Reonte Wright – featured artist (track 8)
Ryan Hudson – featured artist (track 11)
Todd Shaw – featured artist (track 11)
Zachary Lewis Beck – featured artist (track 12)
Candice Freeman – additional vocals (tracks: 3, 5)
Stephen Freeman – keyboard (tracks: 2, 10)
Corbin King – guitar (tracks: 3, 9)
DJ Chris Crisis – cuts (tracks: 1, 2, 6, 9, 11)
Dalton McClelland – producer (track 1)
Roy "Drum Dummie" James – producer (tracks: 2, 3, 9, 11)
Jeffery Richards – producer (track 3)
Gerek Marcin – producer (tracks: 4, 6)
Welka Bartosz Jakub – producer (tracks: 4, 6)
Alexsei Jidkov – producer (track 5)
Jayson Bridges – producer (track 5)
Karl Powell – producer (tracks: 7, 8)
Harrison Johnson IV – producer (track 7)
Gabriel Blizman – producer (track 8)
Da'Auhn Oliver – producer (track 10)
Daniel Watson – producer (track 12), mixing, recording
Freddie Burman – executive producer
Irv Johnson – mastering
Chris Allio – art direction & design
Chad Hess – photography

Charts

References

See also
2019 in hip hop music

2019 albums
Rittz albums